Cannabicyclohexanol (CCH, CP 47,497 dimethyloctyl homologue, (C8)-CP 47,497) is a cannabinoid receptor agonist drug, developed by Pfizer in 1979.  On 19 January 2009, the University of Freiburg in Germany announced that an analog of CP 47,497 was the main active ingredient in the herbal incense product Spice, specifically the 1,1-dimethyloctyl homologue of CP 47,497, which is now known as cannabicyclohexanol. The 1,1-dimethyloctyl homologue of CP 47,497 is in fact several times more potent than the parent compound, which is somewhat unexpected as the 1,1-dimethylheptyl is the most potent substituent in classical cannabinoid compounds such as HU-210.

Enantiomers
Cannabicyclohexanol has four enantiomers, which by analogy with other related cannabinoid compounds can be expected to have widely varying affinity for cannabinoid receptors, and consequently will show considerable variation in potency. While the (-)-cis enantiomer (-)-cannabicyclohexanol discovered in the original Pfizer research is expected to be the most potent, all four enantiomers have been isolated from illicit samples of this compound, and the properties of the other three enantiomers have not been studied in detail. Most commonly cannabicyclohexanol is encountered as a diastereomeric mix of the two cis or two trans isomers in varying ratios, though more rarely a mixture of all four enantiomers has been seen, as well as reasonably enantiopure samples of the most active isomer. Confusion can arise around the naming of these compounds as they can be viewed either as substituted phenols or substituted cyclohexanols, but this results in different numbering of the rings. Consequently, the active isomer can be named either 2-[(1S,3R)-3-hydroxycyclohexyl]-5-(2-methylnonan-2-yl)phenol or (1R,3S)-3-[2-hydroxy-4-(2-methylnonan-2-yl)phenyl]cyclohexan-1-ol.

Toxicity
(C8)-CP 47,497 has been shown to cause DNA damage and inflammation in directly exposed human cells in vitro, though it is unclear if this has any relevance in vivo.

Legal status
Cannabicyclohexanol is not listed in the schedules set out by the United Nations' Single Convention on Narcotic Drugs from 1961 nor their Convention on Psychotropic Substances from 1971, so the signatory countries to these international drug control treaties are not required by said treaties to control Cannabicyclohexanol.

United States
Cannabicyclohexanol is a Schedule I controlled substance in the USA.

Vermont
Effective January 1, 2016, cannabicyclohexanol is a regulated drug in Vermont designated as a "Hallucinogenic Drug."

See also 
 Synthetic cannabinoids
 (C6)-CP 47,497
 (C7)-CP 47,497 also known as CP 47,497
 (C9)-CP 47,497
 JWH-138
 O-1871

References

Cannabinoids
Cyclohexanols
Phenols
Pfizer brands
Designer drugs